Connor Williams (born May 12, 1997) is an American football center for the Miami Dolphins of the National Football League (NFL). He played college football at Texas.

Early years
Williams attended Coppell High School. As a freshman, he started the last 3 games at right tackle. As a sophomore, he was moved to tight end, but by the end of the season he was switched to left tackle.

As a senior, he was a two-way player, allowing one sack and one holding penalty, while making 38 tackles (5 for loss), 3 sacks, 5 quarterback pressures, 5 forced fumbles and 2 passes defensed. He was a second-team 6A All-State and an All-district selection.

He was a teammate of future NFL player Solomon Thomas. He also practiced basketball.

College career
Williams  accepted a football scholarship from the University of Texas. As a freshman, he started all 12 games at left tackle.

The next year, he started 11 out of 12 games at left tackle and was considered by the media and coaches one of the best offensive tackles in college football. He became just the fourth sophomore in school history to receive first-team All-American honors.

As a junior, he suffered a left knee injury in the third game against USC. He returned to play in the eleventh game against West Virginia University. He started only five out of 12 games at left tackle (first 3 and final 2 regular season contests). On November 27, 2017, Williams announced that he would forgo his senior year in favor of the 2018 NFL Draft, and that he would not play in the 2017 Texas Bowl.

Professional career

Dallas Cowboys
Williams was selected by Dallas Cowboys in the second round (50th overall) of the 2018 NFL Draft, with the intention of playing him at guard. He was named the starting left guard, starting the first eight games before being benched in Week 10 in favor of Xavier Su'a-Filo. He then started two games at right guard in place of an injured Zack Martin.

Williams entered the 2019 season as the Cowboys starting left guard. He started 11 games, missing one due to arthroscopic knee surgery, before suffering a torn ACL in Week 13. He was placed on injured reserve on December 1, 2019.

Miami Dolphins
On March 17, 2022, Williams signed a two-year $14 million contract with the Miami Dolphins.

Personal life
His brother, Dalton, also played football for Stephen F. Austin and Akron. He has been outspoken about his experiences with bullies in middle school. His mother is of Mexican descent.

References

External links
Texas bio
Dallas Cowboys bio

Living people
1997 births
All-American college football players
American football offensive tackles
American sportspeople of Mexican descent
Dallas Cowboys players
People from Coppell, Texas
Players of American football from Texas
Sportspeople from the Dallas–Fort Worth metroplex
Texas Longhorns football players
Miami Dolphins players